Sofija Milošević (born March 18, 1991) is a Serbian fashion model. She worked for Serbian fashion designers and brands Diesel and Jeremy Scott in Milan and New York.

Personal life
Sofija was engaged to Filip Živojinović, son of retired Serbian tennis player Slobodan Živojinović and stepson of Serbian singer Lepa Brena; she was also in relationship with Serbian tennis player Viktor Troicki. She had later been dating Serbian footballer Adem Ljajić for three years until 2018. , she is in a relationship with Serbian footballer Luka Jović. They have two children: Aleksej Jović (born 2020) and Teodor Jović (born 2022).

References

External links

1991 births
Living people
Models from Belgrade
Serbian female models
Association footballers' wives and girlfriends